Semitocossus johannes is a species of moth of the family Cossidae. It is found in Israel, Jordan, south-western Turkey and Saudi Arabia.

Adults are on wing from in April, August and October in Israel.

The larvae have been recorded feeding on Calotropis procera.

References

Moths described in 1899
Cossinae
Insects of Turkey